The 2022 Challenge Cup, known for sponsorship reasons as the 2022 Betfred Challenge Cup, was the 121st edition of the Challenge Cup, the main rugby league knockout cup tournament in British rugby league run by the Rugby Football League (RFL). It started on 15 January 2022 and ended, with the final at Tottenham Hotspur Stadium on 28 May.

St Helens were the defending champions going into 2022, but they were eliminated in the semi final by Wigan Warriors, who went on to win the Final, by narrowly defeating Huddersfield Giants 16-14.

Background 
The competition will start on 14 January and conclude with the final on 28 May. Traditionally the Challenge Cup final is held at Wembley Stadium in London. Due to scheduling conflicts between Wembley and the RFL due to a BBC request to play the final earlier in the year in May, it was announced that the 2022 Challenge Cup Final would be held at Tottenham Hotspur Stadium in London. The RFL stated that the final would return to Wembley in 2023. The RFL 1895 Cup would also be played for alongside the Challenge Cup.

All professional RFL member clubs are invited to participate as well as a number of invited amateur teams including teams representing the British Armed forces and police forces. This year it was announced that the Super League's Toulouse Olympique, who are not members of the RFL but are invited to take part in the Challenge Cup, had declined their invitation and would not participate. Newly formed Cornwall R.L.F.C. who will play in RFL League 1 also decided not to enter the competition.

St Helens were the defending champions going into 2022, however, they were eliminated in the Semi final, narrowly losing to Wigan Warriors 18–20.

A new television deal with the BBC came into effect this year, with coverage of more matches of later rounds as well as providing digital coverage of earlier rounds.  The Sportsman will continue its involvement in streaming games that started in 2021 and the RFL will stream some matches on its own streaming service, Our League.  Premier Sports will also broadcast a number of cup game as part of the broadcast deal signed with the RFL in October 2021.

Format and dates

First round
The draw for the first round was made at the Tottenham Hotspur Stadium, and ties were played over the weekend of 14–16 January 2022.

Second round
The draw for the second round was made at the same time at the first. Ties were played over the weekend of 29–30 January 2022. This round sees sides from the League 1 enter.

Third round
The draw for the third round was made on 1 February. Ties were played over the weekend of 12–13 February 2022.

Fourth round
The draw for the fourth round was made at the same time at the third. Ties were played over the weekend of 26–28 February 2022. This round saw sides from the Championship enter.

Fifth round
The draw for the fifth round was made on 28 February at the conclusion of the tie between Leigh and Widnes. Ties were played over the weekend of 12–14 March 2022.

Sixth round
The draw for the sixth round was made on 14 March 2022, at Elland Road, Leeds. Ties were played over the weekend of 25–27 March 2022.

Quarter-finals
The draw for the quarter-finals was made during the half-time broadcast of the sixth-round match between Leeds Rhinos and Castleford Tigers. The draw was hosted by Tanya Arnold, and the teams were drawn by Robbie Hunter-Paul, and John Kear. Ties were played over the weekend of 8–10 April 2022.

Semi-finals
The draw for the semi-finals was made on 10 April. The ties were both played at Elland Road, Leeds on 7 May. They formed a triple-header with the final of the 2022 Women's Challenge Cup.

Final

The final of the 2022 Challenge Cup took place on 28 May at the Tottenham Hotspur Stadium.

Huddersfield second row forward, Chris McQueen was named winner of the Lance Todd Trophy.

Broadcast matches

See also
 2022 Women's Challenge Cup

Notes

References 

Challenge Cup
Challenge Cup
Challenge Cup